Ether Ore is the latest solo album from one of the Chapman Stick frontrunners, Greg Howard. Containing tracks recorded live over a period of several months, it manages to bring Greg's strong sense of improvisation across, into the ears of the listener.

Track listing
"The First Day" - 2:09
"Ether Ore" - 11:03
"Tim Was Here" - 1:56
"Neptune's Wake" - 9:27
"Snow Falling on Eno" - 2:59
"Freedom of Expansion" - 25:33
"Deep Field Calling" - 3:08

Personnel 
Greg Howard - Chapman Stick

References

External links

2005 albums
Greg Howard (musician) albums